The 1955–56 Landsdelsserien was a Norwegian second-tier football league season.

The league was contested by 54 teams, divided into a total of seven groups from four districts; Østland/Søndre, Østland/Nordre, Sørland/Vestre and Møre/Trøndelag. The two group winners in the Østland districts, Sparta and Strømmen promoted directly to the 1956–57 Hovedserien. The other five group winners qualified for promotion play-offs to compete for two spots in the following season's top flight. Årstad and Steinkjer won the play-offs and were promoted.

Tables

District Østland/Søndre

District Østland/Nordre

District Sørland/Vestland

Group A1

Group A2

Group B

District Møre/Trøndelag

Møre

Trøndelag

Promotion play-offs
Sørland/Vestland 
Results A1–A2
Ulf 6–3 Start
Results A–B
Årstad 2–0 Ulf 

Årstad won 2–0 over Ulf and were promoted to Hovedserien.

Møre/Trøndelag
Molde 2–4 Steinkjer
Steinkjer 3–2 Molde

Steinkjer won 7–4 on aggregate and were promoted to Hovedserien.

References

Norwegian First Division seasons
1955 in Norwegian football
1956 in Norwegian football
Norway